Zanzra is a town in central Ivory Coast. It is a sub-prefecture of Zuénoula Department in Marahoué Region, Sassandra-Marahoué District.

Zanzra was a commune until March 2012, when it became one of 1126 communes nationwide that were abolished.

In 2014, the population of the sub-prefecture of Zanzra was 18,545.

Villages
The 19 villages of the sub-prefecture of Zanzra and their population in 2014 are:

Notes

Sub-prefectures of Marahoué
Former communes of Ivory Coast